Roadracers is a 1959 American film. It was released by American International Pictures as a double feature with Daddy-O (1958).

Cast
Joel Lawrence as Rob Wilson 
Marian Collier as Liz 
Skip Ward as Greg Morgan 
Sally Fraser as Joanie Wilson

References

External links
Roadracers at TCMDB

American action films
American auto racing films
1959 films
1950s action films
American International Pictures films
Films scored by Richard Markowitz
1950s English-language films
1950s American films